William Culpepper  may refer to:

William T. Culpepper III, (born 1947) American politician
William Colepeper (died 1726), English politician and poet
Sir William Culpeper, 1st Baronet of Preston Hall (1588–1651), of the Culpeper baronets
Sir William Culpeper, 1st Baronet of Wakehurst (died 1651), of the Culpeper baronets
Sir William Culpeper, 4th Baronet (1668–1740), of the Culpeper baronets